Bifiditermes pintoi, is a species of damp wood termite of the genus Bifiditermes. It is found in Sri Lanka.

References

External links
Glyptotermes chiraharitae n. sp., a new dampwood termite species (Isoptera: Kalotermitidae) from India

Termites
Insects described in 1932
Insects of Sri Lanka